Dakar (born Alejandro Barrera; 9 July 1921 – 14 September 2004) was a Peruvian actor. He appeared in more than twenty films from 1964 to 1982. He also was dedicated to professional wrestling in Argentina, and fought in the Luna Park against Martín Karadagián. In 1973 Dakar participated in the film Titanes en el ring.

Death
Dakar Died of a Acute Lymphoblastic Leukemia on September 14, 2004, at Rome, Italy.

Selected filmography

References

External links 

1921 births
2004 deaths
Peruvian male film actors
20th-century Peruvian male actors
Peruvian expatriates in Italy